Irving Ezra Segal (1918–1998) was an American mathematician known for work on theoretical quantum mechanics. He shares credit for what is often referred to as the Segal–Shale–Weil representation. Early in his career Segal became known for his developments in quantum field theory and in functional and harmonic analysis, in particular his innovation of the algebraic axioms known as C*-algebra.

Biography
Irving Ezra Segal was born in the Bronx on September 13, 1918, to Jewish parents. He attended school in Trenton. In 1934 he was admitted to Princeton University, at the age of 16. He was elected to Phi Beta Kappa, completed his undergraduate studies in just three years time, graduated with highest honors with a bachelor's degree in 1937, and was awarded the George B. Covington Prize in Mathematics. He was then admitted to Yale, and in another three years time had completed his doctorate, receiving his Doctor of Philosophy degree in 1940. Segal taught at Harvard University, then he joined the Institute for Advanced Study in Princeton on a Guggenheim Memorial Fellowship, working from 1941 to 1943 with Albert Einstein and John von Neumann. During World War II Segal served in the US Army conducting research in ballistics at the Aberdeen Proving Ground in Maryland. He joined the mathematics department at the University of Chicago in 1948 where he served until 1960. In 1960 he joined the mathematics department at the Massachusetts Institute of Technology where he remained as a professor until his death in 1998. During his career he supervised 40 doctoral students — 15 at the University of Chicago and 25 at M.I.T. He won three Guggenheim Fellowships, in 1947, 1951 and 1967, and received the Humboldt Award in 1981. He was an Invited Speaker of the International Congress of Mathematicians in 1966 in Moscow and in 1970 in Nice. He was elected to the National Academy of Sciences in 1973.

In 1983 Victor Guillemin edited a festschrift dedicated to Irving Segal. Physics Today published a review of Introduction to Algebraic and Constructive Quantum Field Theory (1992), which Segal coauthored.

Segal died in Lexington, Massachusetts, on August 30, 1998. Edward Nelson's obituary article about Segal concludes: "... It is rare for a mathematician to produce a life work that at the time can be fully and confidently evaluated by no one, but the full impact of the work of Irving Ezra Segal will become known only to future generations."

Chronometric cosmology
Segal provided an alternative to the Big Bang theory of expansion of the universe. The cosmological redshift that motivates the expanding universe theory is due to curvature of the cosmos, according to Segal. Spacetime symmetry is expressed by the Lorentz group and its extension the Poincare group. “The inclusion of the Einstein temporal evolution among the fundamental symmetries gives rise to the conformal group...”<ref>Segal, I.E, Zhou, Z. (1995) Maxwell's Equations in the Einstein Universe and Chronometric Cosmology"], ApJS. Ser. 100, 307–324</ref> But conformal compactification introduces closed timelike curves so Segal portrayed the spatial part of the cosmos as a large 3-sphere with an auxiliary real line for time. Spacetime cannot turn back on itself. At each point in the cosmos there is a convex future direction, meaning, "the future can never merge into the past", no spacetime curvature can close or loop.

Segal reviewed redshift data to verify his cosmology. He claimed confirmation, but generally his chronometric cosmology has not found favor.
For instance, Abraham H. Taub reviewed Mathematical Cosmology and Extragalactic Astronomy, saying 

As for the cosmic microwave background, in the chronometric view, "The observed blackbody... is simply the most likely disposition of remnants of light on a purely random basis... and is not at all uniquely indicative of a Big Bang."

In 2005 A. Daigneault spoke on "Irving Segal's Axiomatization of Spacetime and its Cosmological Consequences" in Budapest.

He concedes at the outset that Segal's cosmology is "generally ignored by astrophysicists", and that the model was first proposed by Einstein in 1917 and is "supposedly discredited".

Selected publications
For a list of 227 articles and 10 books to which Segal contributed, see the MIT external link below.

 1951: 
 1962: Lectures at the Boulder Summer Seminar, American Mathematical Society
 1963: 
 1968: (with Ray Kunze)  
 1976: 
 1992: (with John C. Baez and Zhengfang Zhou)  
 1993: (with Nicoll, J.F., Wu, P., Zhou, Z.) [http://adsabs.harvard.edu/abs/1993ApJ...411..465S Statistically Efficient Testing of the Hubble and Lundmark Laws on IRAS Galaxy Samples, The Astrophysical Journal 465–484
 1995: (with Zhou, Z.) Maxwell's Equations in the Einstein Universe and Chronometric Cosmology, ApJS. Ser. 100, 307–324
 1997: "Cosmic time dilation", The Astrophysical Journal'' 482:L115–17

See also 

 Commutation theorem for traces
 Metaplectic group
 Symplectic group
 Symplectic spinor bundle

References

External links 
 
 
 
 John C. Baez (1999) Memories of Irving Segal
 Leonard Gross and William Segal, "Irving E. Segal", Biographical Memoirs of the National Academy of Sciences (2022)

1918 births
1998 deaths
Princeton University alumni
Yale University alumni
Harvard University faculty
20th-century American mathematicians
Massachusetts Institute of Technology School of Science faculty
Members of the United States National Academy of Sciences
20th-century American Jews